The Tiu Valles  are an outflow channel system in the Oxia Palus quadrangle of Mars, centered at 16.23° North and 34.86° West.

See also

 Chaos terrain
 Geology of Mars
 HiRISE
 Martian chaos terrain
 Outburst flood
 Outflow channels

References

Further reading

Valleys and canyons on Mars
Oxia Palus quadrangle